Coleman's pygmy seahorse (Hippocampus colemani) is a species of fish of the family Syngnathidae. It is found off of the coast of Lord Howe Island, Australia, although unconfirmed occurrences have been reported from Milne Bay and the Ryukyu Islands. It is expected to feed on small crustaceans, similar to other seahorses. Ovoviviparous reproduction is also expected, with males brooding eggs in a pouch before giving birth to live young.

Named after Neville Coleman, an Australian diver and publisher of several popular books on diving and marine biology of the South Pacific area.

Identification

They have small heads, short snouts, thick trunks, and low coronets. Algae that are found on seagrass blades attach to their skins, acting as a form of camouflage. Colouration is generally pale whitish to yellowish, with white circular or elliptical markings outlined with narrow red lines on the trunk, dusky brown bands radiating from the eye, brownish-red appendages, and a slightly brownish tail with red markings.

References

Further reading
Australian Museum
iSeahorse
IUCN Seahorse, Pipefish & Stickleback Specialist Group

Coleman's pygmy seahorse
Taxa named by Rudie Hermann Kuiter
Fish of Lord Howe Island
Coleman's pygmy seahorse